Once Upon a Time in… Donnybrook is a 2022 book by Irish playwright and author Paul Howard and is the twenty-second novel in the Ross O'Carroll-Kelly series.

The title refers to the film Once Upon a Time in… Hollywood and to Donnybrook, location of Donnybrook Stadium where the Ireland women's rugby team play their home games.

Release
Author Paul Howard appeared at the Dromineer Nenagh Literary Festival, and performed a live show based on the novel at The Well, Dublin, on 9 October 2022. The show moved to the Whale Theatre, Greystones in November 2022.

Plot

The country, and Taoiseach Charles O'Carroll-Kelly, attempt to deal with the burning of Leinster House by a Russian-funded mob.

Sorcha is still angry over Ross's adultery with Honor's Irish teacher. Ross becomes manager of the Ireland women's rugby team.

Reception
The book sold 16,406 copies in 2022.

It was nominated for the National Book Tokens Popular Fiction Book of the Year at the 2022 Irish Book Awards.

References

2022 Irish novels
Penguin Books books
Ross O'Carroll-Kelly
Fiction set in 2019
Fiction set in 2020
Works about women's sports